The Ode of Showa Restoration (の, shōwaishin no uta) is a 1930 song by Japanese naval officer Mikami Taku. It was composed as an anthem for the Young Officers Movement.

The song makes strong appeal to natural and religious imagery. It also references the tragic ancient Chinese hero Qu Yuan, a righteous official and poet of the doomed Chu State in pre-imperial China.

Background 
The Showa Restoration was a movement promoted by Japanese author Kita Ikki, with the goal of restoring power to the newly enthroned Japanese Emperor Hirohito and abolishing the liberal Taishō democracy. The aims of the "Showa Restoration" were similar to the Meiji Restoration as the groups who envisioned it imagined a small group of qualified people backing up a strong Emperor.  The Cherry Blossom Society envisioned such a restoration.

The 2-26 Incident was another attempt to bring it about, failing heavily because they were unable to secure the support of the Emperor.  The chief conspirators surrendered hoping to make their trial advance the cause, which was foiled by having the trials conducted secretly.

Although all such attempts failed, it was a first step on the rise of Japanese militarism.

Lyrics

References 

Empire of Japan
Japanese militarism
Shōwa period
Hirohito
Japanese patriotic songs
1930 compositions